The 1824–25 United States Senate Elections were held on various dates in various states. As these U.S. Senate elections were prior to the ratification of the Seventeenth Amendment in 1913, senators were chosen by state legislatures. Senators were elected over a wide range of time throughout 1824 and 1825, and a seat may have been filled months late or remained vacant due to legislative deadlock. In these elections, terms were up for the senators in Class 3.

The Jacksonians gained a majority over the Anti-Jacksonian National Republican Party.

Results summary 
Senate party division, 19th Congress (1825–1827)

 Majority party: Jacksonian (26)
 Minority party: Anti-Jacksonian (22)
 Total seats: 48

Change in composition

Before the elections

Election results

Beginning of the next Congress

Race summaries 
Bold states link to specific election articles.

Special elections during the 18th Congress 
In these special elections, the winners were seated during 1824 or before March 4, 1825; ordered by election date.

Races leading to the 19th Congress 

In these general elections, the winner was seated on March 4, 1825 (except where noted due to late election); ordered by state.

All of the elections involved the Class 3 seats.

Special elections during the 19th Congress 
In these special elections, the winners were seated in 1825 after March 4; ordered by election date.

Alabama

Connecticut

Connecticut (special, class 2)

Connecticut (regular)

Connecticut (special, class 3)

Delaware

Delaware (special, class 1) 
Incumbent Democratic-Republican Caesar A. Rodney resigned on January 29, 1823 after being appointed U.S. Minister Plenipotentiary to the United Provinces of the River Plate, an office now known as the U.S. Ambassador to Argentina, by President James Monroe. A special election was held on January 13, 1824. Federalist Anti-Jacksonian Thomas Clayton, a Delaware State Senator and former congressman was elected to the office, beating Delaware State Representative Henry M. Ridgely, who was also a Federalist, but one with Jacksonian sympathies.

Delaware (special, class 2) 

The Delaware General Assembly had failed to elect a senator in the previous election cycle. Nicholas Van Dyke, the incumbent, was reelected late.

Georgia

Georgia (special)

Georgia (regular)

Illinois

Illinois (special) 

Incumbent Democratic-Republican Ninian Edwards resigned on March 3, 1824 to become the U.S. Minister to Mexico, although he never took office. Former Speaker of the Illinois House of Representatives John McLean, a Democratic-Republican was elected to take his place on November 24, 1824.

Illinois (regular)

Indiana

Kentucky

Louisiana

Louisiana (special) 

Incumbent Democratic-Republican James Brown resigned on December 10, 1823 to become the U.S. Minister to France. A special election was held on January 15, 1824. Both candidates were Democratic-Republicans but were split over loyalties to Andrew Jackson. The Anti-Jacksonian, former congressman Josiah S. Johnston narrowly defeated Jacksonian congressman Edward Livingston.

Louisiana (regular)

Maryland 

Edward Lloyd won election over Ezekiel F. Chambers by a margin of 22.47%, or 20 votes, for the Class 3 seat.

Missouri

New Hampshire

New York

North Carolina

Ohio 

Incumbent Democratic-Republican Jacksonian Ethan Allen Brown was elected in an 1822 special election following the death of William A. Trimble. He was defeated for reelection by William Henry Harrison, a former congressman and war hero, who was an Anti-Jacksonian.

Pennsylvania

Rhode Island (special)

South Carolina

Vermont

Virginia (special)

See also
 1824 United States elections
 1824–25 United States House of Representatives elections
 18th United States Congress
 19th United States Congress

Notes

References

 Party Division in the Senate, 1889-Present, via Senate.gov